Mabel Saeluzika (born 1 May 1956) is a Malawian sprinter. She competed in the women's 200 metres at the 1972 Summer Olympics.

References

1956 births
Living people
Athletes (track and field) at the 1972 Summer Olympics
Malawian female sprinters
Olympic athletes of Malawi
Place of birth missing (living people)
Olympic female sprinters